Auxa armata is a species of longhorn beetle in the subfamily Lamiinae. It was described by Charles Coquerel in 1851.

References

Auxa
Beetles described in 1851
Taxa named by Charles Coquerel